Sally Morrison (born 29 June 1946) is an Australian writer of fiction and biography. She was born in Sydney NSW in 1946 but her family moved to Canberra when her father moved there for a position in the federal public service.

Sally Morrison has been a writer all her life, however, she spent her professional career as a molecular biologist at the University of Melbourne.

Writing career

She started writing in the early 70s when she had a play "Hag" directed by Richard Wherrett at the 1976 National Playwrights Festival.

This was followed by her first novel Who's Taking You to the Dance? in 1979 and in 1989 a collection of stories, I Am a Boat. Her novel Mad Meg won the 1995 Australian National Book Council's Banjo Award and since then there have been two more novels: Against Gravity and The Insatiable Desire of Injured Love.

She has also written a biography of the Australian painter Clifton Pugh, published in 2009 by Hardie Grant, Australia.

Sally Morrison's new novel Window Gods, a sequel to Mad Meg, was published in October 2014 by Hardie Grant in Australia and UK.

Other activities
Recent activities include a presentation made at a Symposium organised by the Royal Society of Victoria within the Department of Microbiology and Infectious Diseases, University of Melbourne, on 18 April 2009 to recognise the life's work of Professor Nancy Millis  and a floor talk The art of Moochin' at the NGV Ian Potter Gallery on 7 August 2010

Works
 1976 Hag: A Play in Three Acts  (unpublished manuscript)
 1979 Who's Taking You to the Dance?  
 1989 I am a Boat: Stories  
 1995 Mad Meg  
 1998 Against Gravity  
 2002 The insatiable desire of injured love  
 2009 After Fire: A Biography of Clifton Pugh  
 2014 Window Gods: truth sleeps in the seed   and 1743582846 (E-Book)

Awards
1995 Australian National Book Council's Banjo Award for Mad Meg.

References

External links
Sally Morrison web site

1946 births
Living people
20th-century Australian novelists
21st-century Australian novelists
Australian women novelists
Australian biographers
21st-century Australian women writers
20th-century Australian women writers
Women biographers